George Tradescant Lay (c. 1800 – 6 November 1845) was a British naturalist, missionary and diplomat.

Lay was a naturalist on the English sailing ship HMS Blossom under the command of Captain Frederick William Beechey from 1825 to 1828, where he collected specimens in the Pacific including California, Alaska, Kamchatka, China, Mexico, South America, and Hawaii, and other South Pacific islands.  He is credited as being one of the discoverers of the flower Layia gaillardioides, as a result having the genus Layia named for him.

He then went on to become a missionary in China for the British and Foreign Bible Society from 1836 to 1839.  During this time, he studied the Chinese language and culture.  Upon returning to England in 1839, his experience in China helped him obtain a position of British Consul in China.  He was posted in Canton in 1843, then Fuzhou in 1844, and finally Amoy in 1845, before dying later that year from a fever.

His son, Horatio Nelson Lay following in his footsteps, was also a diplomat in China.

Published works
The Chinese as They are: Their Moral Social and Literary Character
Trade with China: a letter addressed to the British public on some of the advantages that would result from an occupation of the Bonin Islands. London, 1837. 18pp.

See also
 European and American voyages of scientific exploration

References
George T Lay (archive)
Who's In a Name:  George Tradescant Lay 
Harvard East Asian Monographs #0047: Horatio Nelson Lay and Sino-British Relations, 1854-1864 by Jack J. Gerson
The Botany of Captain Beechey's voyage

English Protestant missionaries
Year of birth uncertain
1845 deaths
Protestant missionaries in China
British expatriates in China
Consuls-General of the United Kingdom in Guangzhou
Missionary botanists